Better Days (Romanized as  Shao nian de ni) is a 2019 Chinese drama film directed by Derek Tsang and written by Lam Wing Sum, Li Yuan and Xu Yimeng. Based on the Chinese young adult novel In His Youth, In Her Beauty (literally "The Youthful You, So Beautiful") by Jiu Yuexi, the film stars Zhou Dongyu (Chinese: 周冬雨) and Jackson Yee (Chinese: 易烊千玺), and follows a high school girl struggling with severe bullying and the pressure of upcoming college entrance exams, whose life becomes intertwined with that of a teenage street thug.

Better Days was released on 25 October 2019 in China and on 8 November 2019 in the United States, United Kingdom, and Canada. One of the most highly anticipated Chinese films in 2019 due to its leads Zhou Dongyu and Jackson Yee's immense popularity, the film became a pop culture phenomenon in China as well as a box office hit, grossing a total of US$230.1 million. A critical success, the film was chosen as the official entry for Hong Kong for Best International Feature Film at the 93rd Academy Awards; it became the third Hong Kong entry in history to achieve the nomination (27 years after Farewell My Concubine, the second), and was the first nominated entry directed by a Hong Kong native rather than by a Mainland Chinese director.

Plot 
After her classmate, Hu Xiaodie, commits suicide because of school bullying, Chen Nian finds herself the new victim of "queen bee" and vicious school bully Wei Lai and her friends. Chen Nian also sees a teenage thug, Liu Beishan, aka "Xiao Bei", being beaten in the streets by rival thugs. She attempts to call the police but is seen and attacked by the thugs as well. The attackers mock her trying to save Xiao Bei and beat both of them until they finally get Chen Nian to kiss Xiao Bei as a way to humiliate them.

Meanwhile, Chen Nian’s school bullies continue to grow fiercer, physically attacking Chen Nian and spreading rumors about her family. After one encounter, where Chen Nian tries to stand up to the bullies, she is brutally pushed down the stairs in front of many other students at school.

Police detectives Zheng Ye and Lao Yang investigate Hu Xiaodie’s death, and while interviewing Wei Lai, make it known that Chen Nian has reported being bullied by Wei Lai. Wei Lai and her friends are all suspended from school as a result and eventually had an even stronger vendetta against Chen Nian. Throughout this time, Chen Nian continues to go to school and prepare for the college entrance exam; however, she gets cornered on her way home from school by the three expelled bullies who chase her with box cutters and a cage of rats. Having nowhere else to go, Chen Nian goes to Xiao Bei’s house and asks him to protect her while she continues studying for and eventually takes the college entrance exam. He agrees and follows her to and from school each day. During this time, Chen Nian and Xiao Bei spend lot of time together and become very close. Chen Nian starts to show concern for Xiao Bei, and he opens up about his past.

Xiao Bei is picked to be in a line up and gets stuck at the police station nearly all night. Without his protection, Chen Nian is caught by the bullies who cut her hair, beat, and strip her, all the while filming her. When Xiao Bei is finally allowed to leave the police station, he runs home to see a bleeding Chen Nian on the floor taping her assignments together with her clothes in tatters and her hair cut. He helps her shave her head and then shaves his too.

The exam draws near and Chen Nian returns to school. On the day of the exam there is heavy rain that causes a landslide. In clearing out the landslide, a man discovers a body. The body is later found to be Wei Lai. After the first day of the two-day college entrance exam, the police bring Chen Nian in for questioning as the main suspect for Wei Lai’s murder. The detectives ask her why she didn’t come to them after the video of her was filmed and she states that she didn’t want anything to affect her studying. She simply wanted to take the exam and move away to Beijing for college.

Chen Nian is escorted by the police to return and finish the exam the next day. On her way home, Xiao Bei grabs her and they run. He explains that the only way for her to continue with her life and go to college is if he takes the blame for Wei Lai's death by saying he assaulted her and accidentally killed her in the process. When Chen Nian reluctantly agrees, he acts like he is assaulting her and the police catch him.

There is a flash back to a scene of Wei Lai begging Chen Nian to not report the video event to the police. Wei Lai offers Chen Nian anything that she could ask for, so long as Chen Nian keeps quiet. Chen Nian tells her that if she never has to see Wei Lai again then she will stay quiet. Wei Lai continues to pester and follow Chen Nian until Chen Nian pushes her in anger. Wei Lai falls down several flights of stairs, hitting her head and dying. In the present, Chen Nian and Xiao Bei both interrogated but stick to the story that the only time they had met was when Xiao Bei attacked Chen Nian.

After Chen Nian gets her score back for the college entrance exam, one of the detectives comes to her house and tells her that Xiao Bei had lied about being a minor and had been sentenced to death. Distraught, Chen Nian admits to her part in the crime. The detective then reveals that he was lying to her to get her to admit to the crime because the sentence would be lighter for both of them. The detective then takes her to see Xiao Bei and they agree to take the lighter sentences, and both go to jail.

A final scene taking place a few years later shows Chen Nian as a teacher who notices a child who looks distressed. Chen Nian approaches the girl and they walk home together, followed closely by Xiao Bei. Before the credits roll there are a few screens explaining the policies that the Chinese government has enacted since the event to prevent bullying in schools and deal stricter punishment to school bullies. There is a final plea for everyone to be aware and take responsibility for youth and their safety.

Cast

Soundtrack

Music with lyrics

Instrumental music

Production
Better Days is adapted from Jiu Yuexi's novel In His Youth, In Her Beauty (the novel was also translated as Young and Beautiful by some sources).

Production started in July 2018 and ended on September 10, 2018. Most of the film was shot on location in Chongqing.

Release
Better Days was released on October 25, 2019, in China. It was released by Well Go USA Entertainment in Mandarin with English subtitles in selected theaters in the United States and Canada.

The film was pulled from the Berlin festival's Generation section.

Critical reception
On Metacritic, the film has a weighted average score of 83 out of 100 based on 5 critic reviews, indicating "universal acclaim". The film also received a rating of 8.4/10 on Chinese film rating cite Douban and a 9.4/10 score on Chinese ticketing site Maoyan. The film topped the list of MovieWeb's Best Chinese Movies of the 2010s.

Cary Darling of the Houston Chronicle stated in 2019 that it was "one of the best films of the year" and that it "deserves a wide audience".

Box office
Better Days grossed more than US$80 million dollars on its opening weekend in China. The film grossed more than 1.29 billion yuan (about 184 million U.S. dollars) in only 15 days in China.

Accolades
The film won the Snow Leopard Special Jury Award at the 6th Asian World Film Festival in Los Angeles in March 2021.

See also
 List of submissions to the 93rd Academy Awards for Best International Feature Film
 List of Hong Kong submissions for the Academy Award for Best International Feature Film

References

External links
 
Better Days at Rotten Tomatoes
 
 

2019 films
Chinese coming-of-age films
Chinese romantic drama films
Chinese teen films
Chinese crime films
Films about examinations and testing
Films about school violence
Films shot in Chongqing
2010s Mandarin-language films